George Herd (born 6 May 1936) is a Scottish former footballer, who played for Inverness Thistle, Queen's Park, Clyde, Sunderland, Vancouver Royal Canadians, Hartlepool United and Scotland.

Player

Herd began his professional football career in the Highland League with Inverness Thistle whilst undertaking his National Service at Fort George Barracks, just outside Inverness. Herd transferred from Inverness Thistle to Scottish Football League amateur club Queen's Park in 1956. He turned professional in May 1957 after moving to Clyde. In his first season at Clyde, he won the 1957–58 Scottish Cup and won his first Scotland cap, a 4–0 defeat to England in April 1958. He won a further four Scotland caps during his time at Clyde before departing for Sunderland in 1961 where he also took up a coaching role in 1969.

He later had a spell at Hartlepool United in 1970–71 before retiring from playing.

Coach and manager 

After his playing career, he had coaching spells at Newcastle United and Sunderland.

Herd was appointed manager of Dumfries club Queen of the South in May 1980 where he worked with players such Allan Ball, Iain McChesney, George Cloy, Nobby Clark and Jimmy Robertson. He left this position midway through the following season from which the club went on a promotion winning run.

Herd joined Darlington in a coaching capacity.

At Northern League outfit Seaham Red Star in 2005, Herd began working with Neil Hixon and Stuart Gooden on the coaching staff. With Hixon as manager, Herd acted as head coach. They earned promotion to Division One of the Northern League, as Division Two runners up in 2006–07

Along with Nixon, Herd moved to Sunderland RCA the following season. They again got promotion from Northern League Division Two in their second season (2009–10).

Honours 

Inverness Thistle

 Inverness Cup: 1953–54

Clyde

Scottish Cup: 1957–58
Glasgow Cup: 1958–59
Glasgow Charity Cup: 1957–58 
 Runner up: 1958–59

Sunderland
Football League Second Division: Promotion 1963–64

Individual

 Clyde FC Hall of Fame: Inducted, 2011

References

External links
 
 
 Clyde FC Hall of Fame profile

1936 births
Scottish footballers
Scottish expatriate footballers
Scotland international footballers
Inverness Thistle F.C. players
Queen's Park F.C. players
Clyde F.C. players
Sunderland A.F.C. players
Vancouver Royals players
Hartlepool United F.C. players
Scottish football managers
Queen of the South F.C. managers
Living people
Scottish Football League players
English Football League players
United Soccer Association players
Association football inside forwards
Scottish Football League representative players
Sportspeople from Lanark
Scotland under-23 international footballers
Scottish Football League managers
Expatriate soccer players in Canada
Scotland amateur international footballers
Scottish expatriate sportspeople in Canada
Hartlepool United F.C. non-playing staff
Sunderland A.F.C. non-playing staff
Darlington F.C. non-playing staff
Footballers from South Lanarkshire